This is a list of the seasons played by Bayern Munich from 1905 when the club first entered a league competition to the most recent seasons. The club's achievements in all major national and international competitions as well as the top scorers are listed. Top scorers in bold were also top scorers of Bundesliga. The list is separated into three parts, coinciding with the three major episodes of German football:

Before 1945 the German league structure was changing rapidly. The end of World War II marks the end of this episode.
From 1945–63 a German league structure without a nationwide league was maintained without greater changes.
Since 1963 a nationwide league, the Bundesliga, exists.

Bayern have won the national championship 32 times; once before the inception of the Bundesliga and 31 times since. The club also won the DFB-Pokal 20 times and the DFL-Ligapokal 6 times, making them the record holder in number of cups and national championships won.

Bayern have won ten European titles: the Cup Winners' Cup in 1967, the UEFA Cup in 1996, the European Cup consecutively three times from 1974 to 1976, the Champions League in 2001, 2013 and 2020 (the latter two as part of seasonal trebles), and the UEFA Super Cup in 2013 and 2020. They additionally won the Intercontinental Cup in 1976 and 2001, and the Club World Cup in 2013 and 2020. Bayern are one of only three clubs to have won the European Cup three times in a row and the first and only German team to win a seasonal treble; they and Barcelona are the only sides to achieve a treble on two occasions.

The club have been relegated just once, in 1955, but were promoted back to the first division football the following season. Bayern were not anointed a spot in the Bundesliga at its inception, and thus played two additional seasons in the second division from 1963 to 1965, earning promotion by winning the qualification playoffs.

Key

 Rank = Final position
 Pld = Matches played
 W = Matches won
 D = Matches drawn
 L = Matches lost
 GF = Goals for
 GA = Goals against
 GD = Goal difference
 Pts = Points
 Avg. att. = Average attendance at home

 GFC = German football championship
 Cup = Tschammerpokal / DFB-Pokal
 OL = Oberliga Süd
 OL2 = 2. Oberliga Süd
 RL = Regionalliga Süd
 BLQ = Bundesliga Qualification round
 BL = Bundesliga
 Europe = European competition entered
 Res. = Result in that competition

 — = Not attended
 NQ = Qualification stage
 R1 = Round 1
 R2 = Round 2
 R3 = Round 3
 R4 = Round 4
 Group = Group stage
 QF = Quarter-finals
 SF = Semi-finals
 RU = Runners-up
 W = Winners

Until 1933

Gauliga (1933–1945)

1945–1963

Since 1963

Notes

References

Seasons
Bayern Munich
German football club statistics